James Francis Murray (December 31, 1894 in Scranton, Pennsylvania – July 15, 1973 in Jamaica, New York) was a pitcher in Major League Baseball. He pitched in four games for the  Brooklyn Robins during the 1922 baseball season. He attended Syracuse University and Villanova University.

External links

1894 births
1973 deaths
Baseball players from Pennsylvania
Sportspeople from Scranton, Pennsylvania
Major League Baseball pitchers
Brooklyn Robins players
Syracuse Orangemen baseball players
Bridgeport Americans players
Newark Bears (IL) players
Providence Grays (minor league) players